Ismael Serrano (born 9 March 1974) is a singer-songwriter and guitarist from Spain, popular in Spain and Latin America, known for his often political lyrics and eclectic musical influences. During his creative career he has been influenced by other Spanish singer-songwriters such as Joaquín Sabina, Joan Manuel Serrat and the Cuban Silvio Rodríguez amongst others. His music also shows influences from renowned poets such as Luis García Montero and Mario Benedetti.

Biography

Early life
He was born in the neighbourhood of Vallecas of Madrid (Spain) on 9 March 1974. After studying Physics in the Complutense University of Madrid, Ismael Serrano started his musical career in the early nineties in Madrid, singing folk based guitar music in a café circuit, at political venues like Libertad 8, Galileo and Nuevos Juglares. The movement proved to be very popular, inspired by the 20-year-old ‘Protest’ song movement under the dictatorship of Francisco Franco, as well as the Nueva canción movement of Latin America.

Atrapados en Azul
In 1997 Ismael Serrano signed with Polygram (now Universal) and released his first album, Atrapados en Azul, featuring the songs "Papá cuéntame otra vez", "Vértigo" and "Amo tanto la vida" that became hymns for youngsters in Spain and Latin America. For this work he was nominated for Best New Artist at the Spanish Musical Awards of the Sociedad General de Autores y Editores.

Second and third records
The follow-up album, La memoria de los peces (1998), increased https://youtube.com/watch?v=EdXWkvKodIo&feature=share popularity (sales level for Platinum in Spain, Gold in Argentina). On his third production Los paraísos desiertos (2000), Serrano moved more to jazz styles and African sounds. Two important music nominations for this work: Best Original Song for the Goya Movie Awards (the "Spanish Oscars") for the song "Km.0" (of the feature with the same title) and Best Sound Engineering at the 2001 Latin Grammy Awards.

Recordings 2002–2007
New productions appeared in the following years: La traición de Wendy (2002), Principio de Incertidumbre (2003, double live concert disc), Naves ardiendo más allá de Orión (2005) (phrase extracted from the final dialogue of the cult film Blade Runner), and Sueños de un hombre despierto (2007) pointing out Ismael Serrano as one of the main exponents of singer-songwriter trend in the Latin music world.

Feature film
In May 2002 Ismael Serrano participated in his second feature film El corazón de Jesus, a German-Chilean-Bolivian production written and directed by Marcos Loayza. Previously, in the year 2000, he sang the eponymous theme song at the close of the film Km. 0, a romantic comedy of errors involving several sets of people who meet at, or otherwise have in common, Kilómetro Cero in Madrid.

Retrospective (2006)
In late 2006, 10th anniversary from the release of his first CD, a retrospective of his work was released as a double CD under the name "El Viaje De Rosetta" (in reference to the Rosetta spacecraft). This deluxe box set contains a disc with all his singles, another disc with rarities, live tracks and collaborations, and a 48-page booklet, and is also available in a single CD and DVD edition.

Discography
Atrapados en azul (1997)

 Papá cuéntame otra vez
 Vértigo
 Donde estarás
 Caperucita
 Yo quiero ser muy promiscuo
 Amo tanto la vida
 La extraña pareja
 El camino de regreso
 México insurgente
 Un muerto encierras
 Atrapados en azul
 Ana

La memoria de los peces (1998)

Últimamente
Al bando vencido
Recuerdo
Ya quisiera yo
Regresa
Vine del norte
Sin ti a mi lado
Tierna y dulce historia de amor
Instrucciones para salvar el odio eternamente
A las madres de mayo
Canción de amor propio
Mi vida no hay derecho
Pequeña criatura
Qué va a ser de mí

Los paraísos desiertos (2000)

Km.0
La mujer más vieja del mundo
No estarás sola
La cita
Tantas cosas
Una historia de Alvite
La huida
Has de saber
La casa encantada
La ciudad parece un mundo
Lo que hay que aguantar
Ya ves

La traición de Wendy (2002)

Eres
Un hombre espera en el desierto
Si peter pan viniera
Cien días
Ahora
Pájaros en la cabeza
Buenos Aires 2001
Prende la luz
Qué andarás haciendo
Fue terrible aquel año
La ciudad de los muertos
Será
Cobertura: 95% del territorio nacional

Principio de incertidumbre (2003)

CD1
Últimamente
 Principio de incertidumbre
 Cien días
 Vine del norte
 Ya llegó la primavera
 Km.0 (con Javier Bergia)
 Eres
 La extraña pareja (con Lichis)
 Aquella tarde
 Pájaros en la cabeza (con Pedro Guerra)
 Amo tanto la vida
 Plaza Garibaldi

CD2
Qué andarás haciendo
Recuerdo
Ya ves (con Luis Eduardo Aute)
Papá cuéntame otra vez
Ahora
Zona Cero
Déjate convencer
Vértigo
Tierna y dulce historia de amor
Un muerto encierras
Prende la luz
No estarás sola
A las madres de mayo

Naves ardiendo más allá de Orión (2005)

Elegía
El virus del miedo
Sucede que a veces
Duermes
Reina del super
Volveré temprano
Alicia
Fragilidad
Allí
El vals de los jubilados
Jóvenes y hermosos
Estamos a salvo
Dulce memoria
Ya nada es lo que era

El Viaje De Rosetta (2006)

CD1 (Singles)

Papá cuéntame otra vez
Dónde estarás
Amo tanto la vida
Atrapados en azul
Mexico insurgente
Caperucita
Últimamente
Vine del Norte
Tierna y dulce historia de amor
Pequeña criatura
Km 0
La mujer más vieja del mundo
No estarás sola
La huida
Eres
Qué andarás haciendo
Cien días
Elegía
Sucede a veces

CD2 (Rarities)

Vértigo (Encuentros con la Habana)
Mira que eres canalla (Tribute to Luis Eduardo Aute)
Con los cinco pinares (Claudio Rodríguez – Poesía necesaria)
Dos kilómetros de paciencia (25 años – Javier Bergia)
El último cantautor (Ni jaulas, ni peceras – La Cabra Mecánica)
Nueces (Esta mañana y otros cuentos – Coti)
El aparecido (Tribute to Víctor Jara)
Caballo de cartón (Un barco de sueños – Cantautores cantan a niños)
Chove en Santiago (Lo mejor de Luar na Lubre)
Vine del norte (Live at Lo + plus)
Ya se van los pastores (Son de niños)
La Locura (OST "El corazón de Jesús")
La Cordura (OST "El corazón de Jesús")
Vuelvo a Madrid (Until now an iTunes only song)
Principio de incertidumbre (15 September 2003)
La extraña pareja (Live with "La Cabra Mecánica" 2 February 2004)
Plaza Garibaldi (27 April 2004)

Sueños de un hombre despierto (2007)

Casandra
Canción para un viejo amigo
Canción de amor y oficina
Nana para un niño indígena
Somos
Zamba del emigrante (feat. Mercedes Sosa)
Habitantes de Alfa-Centauro encuentran la sonda Voyager
Testamento vital
Sesión continua
Si se callase el ruido
Te conocí
Amores imposibles
Para médicos y amantes

Unedited songs

Cita a las siete en La Moncloa
Con una pena de muerte
Cuatro estaciones
La ciudad parece un mundo (primera versión)
La cordura
La locura
La tormenta
Los torpes
Mañana quizás sea tarde
Por qué no te quedas en casa
Por ti
Vente conmigo
Y yo buscándote

Un Lugar Soñando (2009)

Somos
Cancion Para Un Viejo Amigo
Sucede Que A Veces
Cancion De Amor Y Oficina
Caperucita
Penelope Espera En Peumayen
Sesion Continua
Vine Del Norte
A Las Madres De Mayo
Zamba Del Emigrante Con Mercedes Sosa
Si Se Callase El Ruido
Tantas Cosas
Ya Ves
Recuerdo
Canción De Amor Propio
Observando Las Estrellas
Habitantes De Alfa Centauro Encuentran La Sonda Voyager
Ultimamente
Vertigo
Casandra
La Extraña Pareja
Como La Cigarra
Papa Cuentame Otra Vez
Eres
Ya Nada Es Lo Que Era

La Llamada (2014)

Apenas Se Nada de la Vida
Candombe para Olvidar
Pequeña Bachata Mediterránea 
El Día de la Ira
Rebelión en Hamelin
Éramos tan Jóvenes
Quisiera
Mi Problema
La Casa y el Lobo
Absoluto
Te Vi
Ahora Que Te Encuentro
La Llamada

20 años. Hoy es siempre (2017)

CD1
Ven
Las cuatro y diez 
Últimamente
Sucede que a veces
Spaghetti del rock
Pequeña criatura 
Cien 
Te vas 
No estarás sola
Ojalá 
Luces errantes
Busco una canción
Todo cambia
Si se callase el ruido – feat. Rozalén
CD2
Papá, cuéntame otra vez
Recuerdo
La llamada
Ya ves 
Nieve 
Y sin embargo
Vine del norte
Vértigo 
Ahora que te encuentro
Agua y aceite 
Aguas abril 
Todo empieza y todo acaba en ti

Todavía (2018)
Semana
Al bando vencido   
Sin ti a mi lado   
Podría ser
Duermes   
Palabras para Julia
Te odio
Tantas cosas
Crucé un océano
Mi problema   
Amo tanto la vida
Ahora
Testamento vital

References

 Official web page

1964 births
Living people
Spanish male singers
Spanish singer-songwriters
Rock en Español musicians
Musicians from Madrid
Spanish guitarists
Spanish male guitarists
Sony Music Spain artists